Calum McSwiggan (born 21 May 1990) is a British YouTuber, blogger, and online radio presenter. McSwiggan creates video content on LGBT+ issues, mental health, and sex and relationships. He began creating YouTube videos in 2013 and began hosting The Calum McSwiggan Show on Fubar Radio in 2017.

Personal life 
McSwiggan was born in Nottingham and grew up in Derbyshire. He graduated from the University of Derby with a degree in Creative Writing, then worked abroad for several years as an English teacher in Italy, Spain, Switzerland and Germany. He also spent time working in an animal sanctuary in Thailand, raising and caring for tiger cubs. In 2013, he worked for HIV charity Terrence Higgins Trust in London before becoming self-employed as a blogger and online radio presenter in 2018.

Career

YouTube 
McSwiggan began creating YouTube videos in September 2013 and was shortlisted as a finalist for Lastminute.com's nationwide search for a travel blogger later that year. McSwiggan collaborated with LGBT+ charity organisation Switchboard (UK) in June 2015 to support their relaunch with a series of videos featuring notable LGBT+ celebrities including Tom Daley, George Takei, and Matt Lucas. In 2016, McSwiggan co-produced an award-winning documentary on mental health and in 2017 his Love Happens Here video was awarded best LGBT+ short film at Buffer Festival in Toronto.

Writing 
McSwiggan was entertainment editor for the University of Derby student magazine, "Dusted" in 2008 and published his first piece of work in the prose and poetry anthology What We Wrote. McSwiggan began blogging his experiences of travelling solo as a gay man in 2011, and went on to contribute to a number of books including Hannah Witton's sex education book Doing It. In 2017 he signed to literary agent Diamond Kahn & Woods working on his first book.

Radio and podcasts 
McSwiggan began his presenting career at University where he hosted a radio show with friend, author Laura Jane Williams. He presented The Calum McSwiggan Show on FUBAR Radio with LGBT+ guests such as Munroe Bergdorf and Rose McGowan. The show has a commitment to LGBT+ talent and exclusively plays music from LGBT+ artists.  McSwiggan has also spoken about a number of LGBT+ issues on stations including Gaydio and BBC Radio 2. McSwiggan has also co-presented an episode of BBC Radio 4's Gay Britannia and took part in a 24-hour live radio broadcast for UN Women.

Controversy 
In January 2016, McSwiggan uploaded a video I Did Gay Porn and I'm Sorry apologizing for an incident where leaked footage was posted online showing him performing a number of explicit sex acts. He later received criticism from a number of gay pornographic actors who claimed that his views were demonizing of the industry.

In June 2016, McSwiggan pleaded guilty to vandalism after claiming he was attacked during an alleged hate crime in Los Angeles. Charged of filing a false police report were dropped as part of a plea deal. The Los Angeles Police Department confirmed the injuries sustained during the incident were actually self-inflicted, and that the alleged hate crime was a hoax.

References

External links 
 

1990 births
Living people
People from Nottingham
LGBT YouTubers
Gay entertainers
British LGBT entertainers
Alumni of the University of Derby
Lifestyle YouTubers
English entertainers
YouTubers who make LGBT-related content
British male bloggers
English radio presenters
People from Derbyshire
YouTube controversies
LGBT-related controversies in art
20th-century LGBT people
21st-century LGBT people